István Szabó (born 23 April 1945 in Gyöngyös) is a former Hungarian handball player who competed in the 1972 Summer Olympics.

In 1972 he was part of the Hungarian team which finished eighth in the Olympic tournament. He played three matches and scored one goal. Currently he is the player of Budapest Spartacus Sport Club.

References

1950 births
Living people
Hungarian male handball players
Olympic handball players of Hungary
Handball players at the 1972 Summer Olympics
People from Gyöngyös
Sportspeople from Heves County